Julius Biada (born 3 November 1992) is a German professional footballer who plays as an attacking midfielder for  club Saarbrücken.

Career
Biada played as a youth for a number of clubs around his hometown of Cologne, ending up at Bayer Leverkusen, where he broke into the reserve team for the 2011–12 season. He spent the following season with FC Schalke 04 II, where he scored 11 goals, making him the team's joint top scorer along with Manuel Torres.

In July 2013, he signed for SV Darmstadt 98 of the 3. Liga, and made his debut in a first round DFB Pokal match against Borussia Mönchengladbach, as a substitute for Jérôme Gondorf. Darmstadt caused an upset by eliminating the Bundesliga side 5–4 on penalties after the match ended 0–0. In January 2015, Biada transferred from Darmstadt to SC Fortuna Köln.

In 2016, Biada joined Eintracht Braunschweig on a free transfer.

On 25 May 2022, he agreed to join Saarbrücken for the 2022–23 season.

References

External links

1992 births
Living people
Footballers from Cologne
Association football midfielders
German footballers
2. Bundesliga players
3. Liga players
Eintracht Braunschweig players
SC Fortuna Köln players
SV Darmstadt 98 players
FC Schalke 04 II players
Bayer 04 Leverkusen II players
1. FC Kaiserslautern players
SV Sandhausen players
1. FC Saarbrücken players